Christine Thellmann (born 20 December 1986) is a Romanian politician. She was elected to the Chamber of Deputies in December 2020 at the 2020 Romanian legislative election.

References 

Living people
1986 births
Place of birth missing (living people)
21st-century Romanian politicians
Members of the Chamber of Deputies (Romania)
21st-century Romanian women politicians